Tesfaye Jifar (Amharic: ተስፋዬ ጅፋር) born April 23, 1976) is a male Ethiopian long-distance runner.

Jifar won the New York City Marathon in 2001, his time of 2:07:43 standing as the course record for ten years. The same year he was second at the Tokyo Marathon and won the Saint Silvester Marathon held in Brazil. At the Amsterdam Marathon in 1999 he was second and broke the Ethiopian record held by Belayneh Dinsamo. Jifar's time of 2:06:49 hours remains his personal record.

Tesfaye Jifar is a three-time medalist from IAAF World Half Marathon Championships, he won bronze in 1999 and 2000 and silver in 2001.

At the 2001 World Championships in Athletics in Edmonton Jifar finished seventh in the marathon race.

Achievements

References 

1976 births
Living people
Ethiopian male marathon runners
Ethiopian male long-distance runners
New York City Marathon male winners
World Athletics Championships athletes for Ethiopia
20th-century Ethiopian people
21st-century Ethiopian people